Vibrac may refer to:
 Vibrac, Charente
 Vibrac, Charente-Maritime